Taygete platysoma is a moth in the family Autostichidae. It was described by Walsingham in 1910. It is found in Mexico (Durango, Veracruz).

The wingspan is 18–21 mm. The forewings are pale fawn-ochreous, with a short dull brown basal patch and a slightly oblique dark brown half-fascia at one-third from the costa to the fold, somewhat interrupted below its broad costal extremity. A shorter semi-fasciaform blotch of the same colour beyond the middle, not
reaching to the fold in some specimens, but continued posteriorly to the dorsum in others the apex and termen being also clouded with dull brown. The hindwings are pale cinereous, with a slight ochreous tinge.

References

Moths described in 1910
Taygete (moth)